João Miguel Serrano Leonelli (born 1 January 1970), known professionally as João Miguel, is a Brazilian actor. He is known to international audiences for his role in the Netflix series 3%.

Biography
João Miguel was born in Salvador, Bahia. He is the son of politician Domingos Leonelli and artist Magali Serrano.

Career
He began his acting career on television at the age of 9, in Nonato Freire's Bombom Show. At the age of 13 or 14, he debuted as the main character in the play A Viagem de um Barquinho, directed by Petinha Barreto. He also performed in the circus and, along with street children, put on shows in schools, public hospitals, and in the favelas of Salvador as well as the interior of Bahia. At 17, he went to Rio de Janeiro and trained as an actor in the Casa de Arte das Laranjeiras, where he met Luiz Carlos Vasconcelos, actor and director at Group Piolim. He then went to João Pessoa, where he perfected his circus art with Luiz Carlos, and then traveled in Brazil and elsewhere in the world following the piece O Vau da Sarapalha.

He performed in the solo piece Bishop, the story of the Sergipean artist Arthur Bispo do Rosário, which he staged for years in several Brazilian cities. Director Marcelo Gomes invited him to star in the film Cinema, Aspirinas e Urubus, for which he won several awards at the Cannes Film Festival; he himself considers it one of the best movies he has made.

Miguel has appeared in numerous feature films and television projects, including the telenovela Cordel Encantado. He has been called "one of the most talented and versatile actors of his generation". His presence in four of the first six films presented in the Rede Globo 50th anniversary retrospective series , led some to call it, jokingly, the "João Miguel Festival".

Between 2016 and 2018, he held a major role in the first Portuguese-language Netflix original series, 3%.

Filmography

Film

Television

References

External links

 

1970 births
Living people
People from Salvador, Bahia
Brazilian people of Italian descent
Brazilian male film actors
Brazilian male television actors
Brazilian film directors
Brazilian screenwriters